Saritaben Laxmanbhai Gayakwad (born 1 June 1994) is an Indian sprinter who specializes in the 400 metres and 400 metres hurdles. She was part of the Indian women's 4 × 400 metres relay team that won the gold medal at the 2018 Asian Games.

Gujarat Govt. has selected her as a brand ambassador of Gujarat State Poshan Abhiyan.

Early life
Gayakwad was born on 1 June 1994 in a tribal family in Kharadi Amba village, Dang District, Gujarat. She represented her state in national level kho kho competitions till 2010, before making the switch to sprinting. As of 2018, she works as an income tax official.

Career
Gayakwad was selected in the Indian women's 4 × 400 metres relay team for the 2018 Commonwealth Games in Australia. She thus became the first track and field athlete from the state to be selected for the Commonwealth Games. The team came seventh in the final with a timing of 3:33.61. She was then selected for the 2018 Asian Games in the women's 4 × 400 metres relay team. The quartet of Gayakwad, M. R. Poovamma, Hima Das and V. K. Vismaya clocked 3:28.72 in the final to clinch the gold medal.

References

1994 births
Living people
Athletes from Gujarat
People from Dang district, India
Indian female sprinters
Athletes (track and field) at the 2018 Asian Games
Athletes (track and field) at the 2018 Commonwealth Games
Asian Games gold medalists for India
Asian Games medalists in athletics (track and field)
Medalists at the 2018 Asian Games
Commonwealth Games competitors for India
Sportswomen from Gujarat